The xiuhpōhualli (from  + ) is a 365-day calendar used by the Aztecs and other pre-Columbian Nahua peoples in central Mexico. Whatever name that was used for these periods in pre-Columbian times is unknown.

In ancient times the year was composed of eighteen months, and thus it was observed by these Indian people.  Since their months were made of no more than twenty days, these were all the days contained in a month, because they were not guided by the moon but by the days; therefore, the year had eighteen months.  The days of the year were counted twenty by twenty.

The  calendar (in history known as the "vague year" which means no leap day) had its antecedents in form and function in earlier Mesoamerican calendars, and the 365-day count has a long history of use throughout the region. In common with other Mesoamerican cultures the Aztecs also used a separate 260-day calendar. Together, these calendars would coincide once every 52 years, the so-called "calendar round," which was initiated by a New Fire ceremony.

The first year of the Aztec calendar round was called 2 Acatl and the last 1 Tochtli. The solar calendar is connected to agricultural practices and holds an important place in Aztec religion, with each month being associated with its own particular religious and agricultural festivals.

The eighteen  are listed below. The dates in the chart are from the early eyewitnesses, Diego Durán and Bernardino de Sahagún. Each wrote what they learned from Nahua informants. Sahagún's date precedes the Durán's observations by several decades and is believed to be more recent to the Aztec surrender to the Spanish. Both are shown to emphasize the fact that the beginning of the Native new year became non-uniform as a result of an absence of the unifying force of Tenochtitlan after the Mexica defeat.

The 20-day months of the Aztec solar calendar are called (in two sequences):
Izcalli
Atlcahualo or Xilomanaliztli
Tlacaxipehualiztli
Tozoztontli
Hueytozoztli 
Toxcatl or Tepopochtli
Etzalcualiztli
Tecuilhuitontli
Hueytecuilhuitl
Tlaxochimaco or Miccailhuitontli
Xocotlhuetzi or Hueymiccailhuitl
Ochpaniztli
Teotleco or Pachtontli
Tepeilhuitl or Hueypachtli
Quecholli
Panquetzaliztli
Atemoztli
Tititl

The five days inserted at the end of a year are days of reflection and contemplation still observed today. 
Nemontemi

Note: Aztec years were named for the last day of their fourth month according to the 260-day calendar, the tonalpohualli.

Reconstruction of the calendar
For many centuries, scholars have tried to reconstruct the Aztec calendar. A correlation that is accepted in some circles was proposed by professor Rafael Tena (INAH), based on the studies of Sahagún, Durán and Alfonso Caso (UNAM). His correlation argues that the mexica year started on February 13th using the old Julian calendar or February 23rd of the current Gregorian calendar.

See also
Aztec calendar
Tianquiztli

Notes

References

Mesoamerican calendars
Aztec calendars
Obsolete calendars